Wallalong is a rural suburb of the Port Stephens local government area in the Hunter Region of New South Wales, Australia. The suburb is bisected by High Street, along which a small residential zone of 938 people exists. To the east and west of this area the suburb is almost exclusively rural.

First inhabitants 
On the occasion of nearby Seaham's centenary in 1938, Walter John Enright wrote of the district's traditional owners:

On the impacts of colonisation in the Wallalong and Seaham districts, Enright says:

On the subject of massacres of Aboriginal people and Torres Strait Islander people by settlers following colonisation, Enright writes:

Wallalong, however, may not have been entirely without such "frightful blots" on its history. In 1877, a massacre at Wallalong was recounted in correspondence published by the Maitland Mercury and Hunter River General Advertiser:

Reflecting on the massacre, the correspondent goes on to remark that:

While the exact location of the massacre is not provided, an account of floods in 1857 describes how "the first breach it made was at Wallalong, whence the water gradually found its way over a considerable portion of Bowthorne, Hopewell, Barty's Swamps (sic), and all the low lands in that direction". To the east, Wallalong is separated from the "high land" of Brandy Hill, previously known as Ahalton and Warren's Station Paddock, by Barties Swamp. It is possible that the shootings and drownings described as occurring "between the brush and the high land" took place on or about Barties Swamp, between Wallalong and present-day Brandy Hill.

Bowthorne Butter Factory 
Opened by John Lavis trading under the name Bowthorne Creamery and Refrigeration Works. The factory was located on 62 High Street. It was reported that factory was 35 feet long, 25 feet wide and 15 feet high with 8 horse power engine which could produce 350 gallons of milk an hour. In December 1906 a cooperative was formed renamed in Bowthorne Co-operative Butter Factory LTD. The cooperative purchased the factory for £3,934 in January 1907 but Lavis stayed on as manager. The same cooperative purchased the Duckenfield Park Butter Factory at Morpeth. In 1910 Morpeth became the new headquarters.

Notes

References

Suburbs of Port Stephens Council